Manjeshwar  Railway Station  is a major railway station serving the town of Manjeshwar in the Kasaragod District of Kerala, India. It lies in the Shoranur–Mangalore section of the Southern Railways. 

This is the northern most railway station of Kerala. It's situated 4 km south of state's border with Karnataka.

The station has three platforms and four tracks. Trains halting at the station connect the town to prominent cities in India such as Thiruvananthapuram, Kochi, Chennai, Kollam, Bangalore, Kozhikode, Coimbatore, Mangalore etc.

References

Railway stations in Kasaragod district
Palakkad railway division